Kenneth McKenzie Brown (August 3, 1887 – February 28, 1955) was a pulp and paper worker and political figure in the Colony of Newfoundland. He represented Twillingate from 1923 to 1932 as a member of the Fisherman's Protective Union and Grand Falls from 1932 to 1934 as a member of the United Newfoundland Party in the Newfoundland and Labrador House of Assembly.

He was born in King's Cove, Bonavista Bay, the son of James Brown and Caroline Gill, and was educated there. Brown worked as a seaman on the British Columbia coast, returning to Newfoundland around 1909. He was employed by the Anglo-Newfoundland Development Company at its mill in Grand Falls. In 1919, he married Violet I. Hollett. Brown became president of the Fisherman's Protective Union in 1936. From 1944 to 1947, he was president of the Newfoundland Seamen's Association. Brown was elected to represent Bonavista South in the Newfoundland National Convention. He opposed union with Canada. Brown collapsed due to a cerebral hemorrhage while speaking at the convention on October 30, 1946. He later died at the age of 67 in St. John's.

References 
 

Fishermen's Protective Union MHAs
1887 births
1955 deaths
United Newfoundland Party MHAs
Newfoundland National Convention members